Ochyrotica is a genus of moths in the family Pterophoridae and only genus in the Ochyroticinae subfamily. Ochyrotica was described by Lord Walsingham in 1891 and the subfamily Ochyroticinae was described by Lutz Thilo Wasserthal in 1970.

Species
Ochyrotica africana (Bigot, 1969)
Ochyrotica bjoernstadti Gielis, 2008
Ochyrotica borneoica Gielis, 1988
Ochyrotica breviapex Gielis, 1990
Ochyrotica buergersi Gaede, 1916
Ochyrotica celebica Arenberger, 1988
Ochyrotica concursa (Walsingham, 1891)
Ochyrotica connexiva (Walsingham, 1891)
Ochyrotica cretosa (Durrant, 1916)
Ochyrotica diehli Arenberger, 1997
Ochyrotica fasciata Walsingham, 1891
Ochyrotica gielisi Arenberger, 1990
Ochyrotica javanica Gielis, 1988
Ochyrotica koteka Arenberger, 1992
Ochyrotica kurandica Arenberger, 1988
Ochyrotica mexicana Arenberger, 1990
Ochyrotica misoolica Gielis, 1988
Ochyrotica moheliensis Gibeaux, 1994
Ochyrotica placozona Meyrick, 1921
Ochyrotica pseudocretosa Gielis, 1991
Ochyrotica rufa Arenberger, 1987
Ochyrotica salomonica Arenberger, 1991
Ochyrotica taiwanica Gielis, 1990
Ochyrotica toxopeusi Gielis, 1988
Ochyrotica yanoi Arenberger, 1988
Ochyrotica zolotuhini Ustjuzhanin & Kovtunovich, 2010

Ochyroticinae
Taxa named by Thomas de Grey, 6th Baron Walsingham
Moth genera